Marco Vianello (born 30 August 1983) is an Italian footballer who plays for Seconda Divisione club Avellino.

Biography
Born in Venice, Veneto, Vianello started his career with A.C. Milan. In 2002–03 season he was loaned to Avellino and won Serie C1 champion. In July 2003, his loan was extended and Milan also loaned Matteo Contini, Vitali Kutuzov to the Campania side. In January 2004, he left for Sora along with Gianpaolo Parisi.

He then spent all of his career in Italian Lega Pro divisions. In August 2009 he was signed by Gela along with Evangelista Cunzi. In July 2010 he was signed by newly promoted Seconda Divisione club Avellino. He made his first start since left the club  years ago on 15 August 2010, a 0–0 draw with Neapolis Mugnano in 2010–11 Coppa Italia Lega Pro.

References

External links
 Avellino Profile 
 Football.it Profile 
 
 FIGC 

Italian footballers
Serie B players
A.C. Milan players
U.S. Avellino 1912 players
U.S. Sassuolo Calcio players
S.S.D. Sanremese Calcio players
Potenza S.C. players
A.S.D. Cassino Calcio 1924 players
S.S.D. Città di Gela players
Association football wingers
Footballers from Venice
1983 births
Living people